Balaesang is a Celebic language of Sulawesi in Indonesia.

It is spoken in the three villages of Kamonji, Ketong, and Rano  on Balaesang Peninsula, Sulawesi. Most people in Balaesang District, however, are ethnic Pendau.

References

Tomini–Tolitoli languages
Languages of Sulawesi